"Joe Hill", also known as "I Dreamed I Saw Joe Hill Last Night", is a folk song named after labor activist Joe Hill, which was originally written in poem by Alfred Hayes in 1925 and composed into music by Earl Robinson in 1936.

Reception 
In 2014, the Paul Robeson version of the song was the third-most requested song by British Labour politicians on Desert Island Discs, behind "Jerusalem" and "Nkosi Sikelel' iAfrika", with the song also chosen by then-party leader Ed Miliband.

Covers and adaptations 
 Joan Baez performed the song at the Woodstock music festival in 1969 and later included it in her album, One Day at a Time
 On International Workers' Day in 2014, at Tampa, Florida, Bruce Springsteen and the E Street Band opened their show with a cover of the song.

References 

1936 songs
American folk songs
Bruce Springsteen songs
Joan Baez songs
Joe Hill (activist)
Paul Robeson songs
Protest songs
Songs about activists
Songs about dreams
Trade union songs
Songs written by Earl Robinson